Brocton is a village in Embarrass Township, Edgar County, Illinois, United States. The population was 273 at the 2020 census.

Geography

Demographics
As of the 2020 census there were 273 people, 146 households, and 99 families residing in the village. The racial makeup of the village was 96.34% White and 3.66% from two or more races. Hispanic or Latino of any race were 1.10% of the population.

There were 146 households, out of which 27.40% had children under the age of 18 living with them, 62.33% were married couples living together, 4.11% had a female householder with no husband present, and 32.19% were non-families. 20.55% of all households were made up of individuals, and 10.96% had someone living alone who was 65 years of age or older. The average household size was 2.56 and the average family size was 2.29.

The village's age distribution consisted of 17.0% under the age of 18, 7.5% from 18 to 24, 13.5% from 25 to 44, 43.6% from 45 to 64, and 18.5% who were 65 years of age or older. The median age was 48.6 years. For every 100 females, there were 97.1 males. For every 100 females age 18 and over, there were 86.6 males.

The median income for a household in the village was $51,591, and the median income for a family was $63,958. Males had a median income of $32,188 versus $28,750 for females. The per capita income for the village was $23,881. About 11.1% of families and 16.5% of the population were below the poverty line, including 33.9% of those under age 18 and 9.7% of those age 65 or over.

Education
Brocton had its own high school until 1952.  The Brocton High School mascot was the "Purple Martins".  In 1952, schools in Brocton and Redmon consolidated.  Brocton-Redmon High School (mascot: "Blackhawks") continued in its place until 1968, when it merged with Young America High School in Metcalf to form Shiloh School.

In popular culture
Brocton is a prominent location in the David Baldacci novel Memory Man. Printings of the book include a map and several pictures of the village.

References

Villages in Illinois
Villages in Edgar County, Illinois